André Luís or André Luiz is a given name, may refer to:

Sports

Football
André Luís Ferreira (born 1959), Brazilian footballer
André Luís Garcia (born 1979), Brazilian footballer
André Luiz Ladaga (born 1975), naturalized Azerbaijani footballer
André Luiz Moreira (born 1974), Brazilian footballer
André Luiz Silva do Nascimento (born 1980), Brazilian football defender
André Luiz de Oliveira Regatieri (born 1983), Brazilian footballer
André Luís Leite (born 1986), Brazilian footballer
André Luis (footballer, born 1994), born André Luis Silva de Aguiar, Brazilian forward
André Luis (footballer, born 1997), born André Luis da Costa Alfredo, Brazilian forward

See also

Compound given names